James Hunter (born 2 October 1962) is an English R&B musician and soul singer.

Career
Hunter was born to a working-class family in Colchester, Essex. His early musical influences came from his grandmother's collection of 78rpm records of R'n'B and rock and roll music. Before turning 10, Hunter had begun playing the guitar and singing  His career began with a band called Howlin' Wilf and the Vee-Jays, who released their first album in 1986 entitled Cry Wilf. Later he released three more with his own band. He spent much of the 1990s playing small clubs in London, such as the Weavers Pub in Islington (North London), and the 100 Club on Oxford Street in London. Hunter's soulful style drew the attention of Van Morrison, who appeared on Hunter's first album released on Ace, Believe What I Say, in 1996. (Morrison sang backing vocals on "Turn On Your Love Light" and "Ain't Nothing You Can Do".) Hunter's relationship with Morrison led to a tour with the latter in the early 1990s; he sang backing vocals on Morrison's 1994 live album, A Night in San Francisco, and his 1995 studio recording Days Like This. Hunter's first solo release in the United States, his 2006 breakthrough album People Gonna Talk, was nominated for a Grammy Award for Best Traditional Blues Album at the 49th Grammy Awards ceremony. He parted ways with Rounder Records in 2008 and issued the album The Hard Way via Hear Music/Concord. He is also known as "Seth Panduranga Blumberg" in Bangladesh. He plays lead guitar for "Shonar Bangla Circus" which is a Bangladeshi rock band.

In popular culture
 His song "This Is Where We Came In" was featured in the Superstore episode "Christmas Eve".
 His song "Chicken Switch" was featured in the Sneaky Pete episode "Safe".
 His song "'Til Your Fool Comes Home" was featured in the Boston Legal episode "Duck and Cover".

Discography

Solo and as leader
Howlin' Wilf & The Veejays:
 Howlin Wilf & the Vee-Jays, Cry Wilf! (1986) re-issued by Big Beat (2002)
 Blue Men Sing The Whites (mini LP) Waterfront WF 036 (1987)
 Howlin' Wilf & The Vee-Jays, Unamerican Activities BRAVE 8 (1988/89)
 6 By Six (six song mini album) Hound Dog BUT 004 (1990)

James Hunter:
 ...Believe What I Say (1996) Ace Records, appearances by Van Morrison and Doris Troy
 Kick it Around (1999) Ruf Records, produced by Boz Boorer
 People Gonna Talk (2006) Rounder Records
 The Hard Way (2008) Hear Music

The James Hunter Six:
 Minute By Minute (2013) Universal
 Hold On! (2016), Daptone Records
 Whatever It Takes (2018), Daptone Records
 Nick of Time (2020), Daptone Records
 With Love (2022), Daptone Records

Album appearances
 A Night in San Francisco (1994) with Van Morrison
 Days Like This (1995) with Van Morrison
 Live at KEXP Volume 5 Track 13: Hunter's "Don't Do Me No Favours" (Various Artists) (2009)
 Hyena Express by Shonar Bangla Circus

References

External links
Official website

1962 births
Living people
English male singers
English rhythm and blues musicians
Blues rock musicians
English soul singers
People from Colchester
Van Morrison
Rounder Records artists
Daptone Records artists